Rosemary Shirley DeCamp (November 14, 1910 – February 20, 2001) was an American radio, film, and television actress.

Life and career

Early life 
Rosemary Shirley DeCamp was born in Prescott, Yavapai, Arizona on November 14, 1910 to William Valentine DeCamp and Margaret Elizabeth Hinman.

Radio
DeCamp first came to fame in November 1937, when she took the role of Judy Price, the secretary/nurse of Dr. Christian in the long-running Dr. Christian radio series. She also played in The Career of Alice Blair, a transcribed syndicated soap opera that ran in 1939–1940.

Film and television
She made her film debut in Cheers for Miss Bishop and appeared in many Warner Bros. films, including Eyes in the Night, Yankee Doodle Dandy playing Nellie Cohan opposite James Cagney, This Is The Army playing the wife of George Murphy and the mother of Ronald Reagan, Rhapsody in Blue, and Nora Prentiss. She played the mother of the character played by Sabu Dastagir in Jungle Book.

In 1951 and 1953, respectively, she starred in the nostalgic musical films On Moonlight Bay and its sequel, By The Light Of The Silvery Moon, as Alice Winfield, Doris Day's mother, opposite Leon Ames.

DeCamp played Peg Riley in the first television version of The Life of Riley opposite Jackie Gleason in the 1949–1950 season, then reprised the role on radio with original star William Bendix for an episode of Lux Radio Theater in 1950. From 1955–1959, she was a regular on the popular NBC television comedy The Bob Cummings Show, playing Margaret MacDonald.

She appeared in the 1961 Rawhide episode, "Incident Near Gloomy River". In 1962, she played a dishonest Southern belle in the NBC sitcom Ensign O'Toole with Dean Jones. She appeared in the role of Gertrude Komack on ABC's medical drama Breaking Point in the episode entitled "A Little Anger is a Good Thing".

DeCamp appeared twice in different roles on Death Valley Days. In 1965, she played newspaper editor Caroline Romney of Durango, Colorado, in the episode "Mrs. Romney and the Outlaws". She portrayed Hannah Bailey, wife of James Briton "Brit" Bailey, in the 1969 episode "Here Stands Bailey". During the 1960s, she appeared in commercials for the laundry product 20 Mule Team Borax, which sponsored Death Valley Days.

DeCamp had a recurring role as Helen Marie, the mother of Marlo Thomas's character on the ABC sitcom That Girl from 1966–1970. She appeared in several 1968 episodes of the CBS sitcom Petticoat Junction as Kate Bradley's sister, Helen, filling in as a temporary replacement for the ailing Bea Benaderet as the mother figure to Bradley's three daughters.

DeCamp appeared in 2 episodes of The Beverly Hillbillies as Mrs Priscilla Rolfe Smith-Standish, a famous expert on antiquities who befriended the Clampetts.

DeCamp made several appearances as the mother of Shirley Partridge in The Partridge Family from 1970–1973. She also played The Fairy Godmother in the 1980s TV show, The Memoirs of a Fairy Godmother.

DeCamp played Buck Rogers' mother in flashback scenes of the Buck Rogers in the 25th Century episode "The Guardians" (1981).

On July 7, 1946, her Beverly Hills home was damaged when struck by a wing after the experimental XF-11 piloted by Howard Hughes (re-created in the 2004 movie, The Aviator) crashed nearby. Although a piece of the wing and a part of the neighbor's roof landed in DeCamp's bedroom (where she and her husband were sleeping) they sustained no injuries.

Personal life and death 
DeCamp was married to Inglewood Municipal Judge John Ashton Shidler for 57 years from 1941 until his death in 1998. The Shidlers raised four daughters: Margaret, Martha, Valerie, and Nita. Outliving most of her contemporaries, DeCamp died of pneumonia in 2001, age 90. She was cremated and her ashes given to her daughter.

DeCamp was the author of a children's book, Here, Duke! The Adventures of an Irish Setter, which was published by the David McKay Company, in 1962. In 2009, an autobiographical book of her life in film and television titled Rosemary De Camp: Tigers in My Lap was published posthumously. 

DeCamp was an active Democrat in California.

Filmography

Cheers for Miss Bishop (1941) as Minna Fields 
Hold Back the Dawn (1941) as Berta Kurz
Jungle Book (1942) as Messua
Yankee Doodle Dandy (1942) as Nellie Cohan
Smith of Minnesota (1942) as Mrs. Smith
Eyes in the Night (1942) as Vera Hoffman
Commandos Strike at Dawn (1942) as Hilma Arnesen
City Without Men (1943) as Mrs. Slade 
This Is the Army (1943) as Ethel Jones 
The Merry Monahans (1944) as Lillian Miles
Bowery to Broadway (1944) as Bessie Kirby
Practically Yours (1944) as Ellen Macy
Blood on the Sun (1945) as Edith Miller
Rhapsody in Blue (1945) as Rose Gershwin
Pride of the Marines (1945) as Virginia Pfeiffer
Week-End at the Waldorf (1945) as Anna
Danger Signal (1945) as Dr. Jane Silla
Too Young to Know (1945) as Mrs. Enright
From This Day Forward (1946) as Martha Beesley
Two Guys from Milwaukee (1946) as Nan
Nora Prentiss (1947) as Lucy Talbot
The Life of Riley (1949) as Peg Riley
Night Unto Night (1949) as Thalia Shawn
Look for the Silver Lining (1949) as Mama Miller
The Story of Seabiscuit (1949) as Mrs. Charles S. Howard
The Big Hangover (1950) as Claire Bellcap 
Night into Morning (1951) as Mrs. Annie Ainley
On Moonlight Bay (1951) as Alice Winfield
Scandal Sheet (1952) as Charlotte Grant
The Treasure of Lost Canyon (1952) as Samuella 
By the Light of the Silvery Moon (1953) as Alice Winfield
Main Street to Broadway (1953) as Mrs. Craig
Man on a Bus (1955)
Many Rivers to Cross (1955) as Lucy Hamilton
Strategic Air Command (1955) as Mrs. Thorne
13 Ghosts (1960) as Hilda Zorba 
  The Beverly Hillbillies   (1963) as Pricilla Rolfe Allen Smith-Standish 
Petticoat Junction (1964) as Emily Mapes, (1968) Aunt Helen
Saturday the 14th (1981) as Aunt Lucille 
A Chip of Glass Ruby (1983) as Mother

References

External links

 

1910 births
2001 deaths
20th-century American actresses
Actresses from Los Angeles
Actresses from New York City
American film actresses
American radio actresses
American television actresses
California Democrats
Deaths from pneumonia in California
Warner Bros. contract players